Noël Van Clooster (born 2 December 1943) is a Belgian former racing cyclist. He rode in four editions of the Tour de France, as well as two editions of the Giro d'Italia and one Vuelta a España.

Major results

1965
 1st Kattekoers
 1st Stage 2a Tour du Nord
 3rd Grand Prix d'Isbergues
1966
 2nd Gent–Wevelgem
 8th Rund um den Henninger Turm
1967
 1st De Kustpijl
1968
 5th Overall Vuelta a Andalucía
1st Stage 4
1969
 1st Omloop van het Houtland Lichtervelde
1970
 1st Kampioenschap van Vlaanderen
 1st Torhout
 2nd GP Union Dortmund
 2nd GP Flandria
1971
 1st Brussels–Ingooigem
 4th Rund um den Henninger Turm
 4th Kuurne–Brussels–Kuurne
 9th Overall Tirreno–Adriatico
1972
 1st Omloop van Oost-Vlaanderen
 1st De Kustpijl
 2nd Overall Tour d'Indre-et-Loire
 2nd Kuurne–Brussels–Kuurne
 5th Overall Tirreno–Adriatico
1974
 4th Bordeaux–Paris

References

External links
 

1943 births
Living people
Belgian male cyclists
Place of birth missing (living people)